Waitemata Rugby Football and Sports Club is a rugby union club based in Waitakere City, Auckland. The club is affiliated with the Auckland Rugby Football Union. Waitemata was founded in 1927 after an amalgamation of the Hobsonville, Waimauku and Swanson clubs. The club was based at Smythe Park until 1951, when the club moved to the present day grounds at Waitemata Park in Henderson. Waitemata has won the Gallaher Shield on four occasions, with the most recent success coming in 2003.

Honours
Gallaher Shield (4):
1958, 1962, 1975, 2003

Jubilee Trophy:
2019

Portola Trophy:
2021

All Blacks
Waitemata has produced four All Blacks - Adrian Clarke, Kenneth Carrington, Michael Jones and Sione Lauaki. Former Auckland and All Blacks coach John Hart also played for and coached Waitemata.

External links
Club Website
Auckland RFU profile

Sport in Auckland
New Zealand rugby union teams